Stéphane Cali (born 26 April 1972 in Paris) is a retired French athlete who specialised in the sprinting events. He won the bronze medal in the 60 metres at the 1998 European Indoor Championships. He represented his country at the 1997 World Championships reaching the quarterfinals.

Competition record

Personal bests
Outdoor
100 metres – 10.15 (+1.7 m/s) (La Chaux-de-Fonds 1997)
200 metres – 21.26 (+0.4 m/s) (La Valette (FRA) 1996)

Indoor
50 metres – 5.65 (Eaubonne 1998) NR
60 metres – 6.53 (Eaubonne 1998)

References

1972 births
Living people
French male sprinters
Athletes from Paris
Mediterranean Games bronze medalists for France
Mediterranean Games medalists in athletics
Athletes (track and field) at the 1997 Mediterranean Games